Esporte Clube Iranduba da Amazônia, commonly known as Iranduba, is a Brazilian men's and women's football club based in Iranduba, Amazonas state. The women's team competed in the Copa do Brasil de Futebol Feminino once.

History
The club was founded on January 18, 2011. They won the Campeonato Amazonense Second Level in 2011, sharing the title with Manicoré and thus being promoted to the 2012 Campeonato Amazonense.

Women's team
The women's team competed in the Copa do Brasil in 2011, when they were eliminated in the Round of 16 by Tuna Luso.

Achievements

 Campeonato Amazonense Second Level:
 Winners (1): 2011

Stadium
Esporte Clube Iranduba da Amazônia play their home games at Estádio SESI. The stadium has a maximum capacity of 2,000 people.

References

Association football clubs established in 2011
Football clubs in Amazonas (Brazilian state)
Women's football clubs in Brazil
2011 establishments in Brazil